A premiere is the first artistic performance of theatrical, musical or other cultural presentations.

Premiere may also refer to:

Film
 Premiere (1937 film), an Austrian musical crime film
 Premiere (1938 film), a British mystery film
 The Premiere (film), a 2009 mockumentary telefilm

Television

Channels and networks
 La Première (Ivory Coast), an Ivorian television channel operated by Radiodiffusion Television Ivoirienne
 Premiere (TV channel), a defunct British television channel
 Réseau Outre-Mer 1re, a network of radio and television stations for the overseas departments and territories of France
 Sky Deutschland, a German pay-television platform formerly known as Premiere
 Premiere (Brazil), a Brazilian television network

Programs
 Premiere (TV program), the first commercially sponsored television program to be broadcast in color
 Premiere (TV series), a 1960s anthology TV series

Episodes
 "Premiere" (Farscape)
 "Premiere" (The O.C.)
 "The Premiere" (Schitt's Creek)
 "The Premiere" (Yes, Dear)

Radio
 La Première (Belgium), a Belgian radio station operated by RTBF
 La Première (Switzerland), a French-language radio network in Switzerland
 Première Chaîne, a Canadian radio network operated by CBC Radio
 Premiere Networks, also formerly Premiere Radio Networks, a syndication service
 La Première (France), a network of radio and television stations for the overseas departments and territories of France

Music
 Première (Katherine Jenkins album)
 Première (New Brunswick Youth Orchestra album)

Other uses
 Adobe Premiere Pro, a video-editing software program
 Lincoln Premiere, a 1950s luxury car by the Ford Motor Company
 Première, a term in secondary education in France
 Premiere (magazine), a magazine of films and filmmaking
 Premiere (video game), a side-scrolling platform video game

See also

 La 1ère (disambiguation), "Première"
 Premier (disambiguation)
 Premiership (disambiguation)
 
 
 
 
 First (disambiguation), premiere